Zheng Lulu (born ) is a Chinese female  track cyclist, and part of the national team. She competed at the 2008 and 2009 UCI Track Cycling World Championships and won the silver medal in the team sprint event in 2008.

References

External links
 Profile at cyclingarchives.com

1987 births
Living people
Chinese track cyclists
Chinese female cyclists
Place of birth missing (living people)
21st-century Chinese women